In enzymology, a cephalosporin-C transaminase is an enzyme that catalyzes the chemical reaction

(7R)-7-(5-carboxy-5-oxopentanoyl)aminocephalosporinate + D-glutamate  cephalosporin C + 2-oxoglutarate

Thus, the two substrates of this enzyme are (7R)-7-(5-carboxy-5-oxopentanoyl)aminocephalosporinate and D-glutamate, whereas its two products are cephalosporin C and 2-oxoglutarate.

This enzyme belongs to the family of transferases, specifically the transaminases, which transfer nitrogenous groups.  The systematic name of this enzyme class is cephalosporin-C:2-oxoglutarate aminotransferase. Other names in common use include cephalosporin C aminotransferase, and L-alanine:cephalosporin-C aminotransferase.  This enzyme participates in penicillin and cephalosporin biosynthesis.

References

 

EC 2.6.1
Enzymes of unknown structure